This list of botanical gardens and arboretums in Alaska is intended to include all significant botanical gardens and arboretums in the U.S. state of Alaska. There are four botanical gardens in Alaska listed as having been designated significant.

References 

Botanical gardens in Alaska
Arboreta in Alaska
botanical gardens and arboretums